Tunstead Milton is a village in Derbyshire, England.

It is situated on the B5470 road west of, and in the parish of Chapel-en-le-Frith, near the northern edge of the Combs Reservoir.

It is the location of Tunstead Dickey, a "Screaming Skull", and is mentioned in Highways and Byways in Derbyshire by J B Frith, a guide published in 1905, and in Black's Guide published throughout the 19th century.

The name Tunstead is likely derived from hundred homestead and Milton from mill town.

The hamlet had in the past a post office, a garage and two public houses, all of which have now closed.

It should not be confused with Tunstead, which is roughly five miles to the southeast, near Wormhill.

References

External links

Villages in Derbyshire
Towns and villages of the Peak District
Chapel-en-le-Frith